The University of Maine (UMaine or UMO) is a public land-grant research university in Orono, Maine. It was established in 1865 as the land-grant college of Maine and is the flagship university of the University of Maine System. It is classified among "R1: Doctoral Universities – Very high research activity".

With an enrollment of approximately 11,500 students, UMaine is the state's largest college or university. The University of Maine's athletic teams, nicknamed the Black Bears, are Maine's only Division I athletics program. Maine's men's ice hockey team has won two national championships.

History

The University of Maine was founded in 1862 as a function of the Morrill Act, signed by President Abraham Lincoln. Established in 1865 as the Maine State College of Agriculture and the Mechanic Arts, the college opened on September 21, 1868, and changed its name to the University of Maine in 1897.

By 1871, curricula had been organized in Agriculture, Engineering, and electives. The Maine Agricultural and Forest Experiment Station was founded as a division of the university in 1887. Gradually the university developed the Colleges of Life Sciences and Agriculture (later to include the School of Forest Resources and the School of Human Development), Engineering and Science, and Arts and Sciences. In 1912 the Maine Cooperative Extension, which offers field educational programs for both adults and youths, was initiated. The School of Education was established in 1930 and received college status in 1958. The School of Business Administration was formed in 1958 and was granted college status in 1965. Women have been admitted into all curricula since 1872. The first master's degree was conferred in 1881; the first doctor's degree in 1960. Since 1923 there has been a separate graduate school.

Near the end of the 19th century, the university expanded its curriculum to place greater emphasis on liberal arts. As a result of this shift, faculty hired during the early 20th century included Caroline Colvin, chair of the history department and the nation's first woman to head a major university department.

In 1906, The Senior Skull Honor Society was founded to "publicly recognize, formally reward, and continually promote outstanding leadership and scholarship, and exemplary citizenship within the University of Maine community."

On April 16, 1925, 80 women met in Balentine Hall  faculty, alumnae, and undergraduate representatives  to plan a pledging of members to an inaugural honorary organization. This organization was called "The All Maine Women" because only those women closely connected with the University of Maine were elected as members. On April 22, 1925, the new members were inducted into the honor society.

When the University of Maine System was incorporated, in 1968, the school was renamed by the legislature over the objections of the faculty to the University of Maine at Orono. This was changed back to the University of Maine in 1986.

Organization and administration
The University of Maine is the flagship of the University of Maine System. The president of the university is Joan Ferrini-Mundy. The senior administration governs cooperatively with the chancellor of the University of Maine system, Dannel Malloy, and the sixteen members of the University of Maine Board of Trustees (of which fifteen are appointed by the governor of Maine and one is the current Maine state commissioner of education). The Board of Trustees has full legal responsibility and authority for the university system. It appoints the chancellor and each university president, approves the establishment and elimination of academic programs, confers tenure on faculty members, and sets tuition rates and operating budgets.

UMaine is also one of a handful of colleges in the United States whose Student Government is incorporated. Student Government was formed in 1978 and incorporated in 1987. It is classified as a 501(c)(3) not-for-profit corporation. It consists of a legislative branch, which passes resolutions, and an executive branch, which helps organize on-campus entertainment and guest speakers, works with new and existing student organizations, and performs other duties. Other organizations fall under the umbrella of Student Government Inc., including representative boards, community associations, and many other student groups. The Maine Campus, the student newspaper, is also incorporated and does not operate under or receive money from student government.

Campus

Location and layout

Situated on Marsh Island, between the Penobscot and Stillwater rivers, the University of Maine is the nation's only land grant university (other than the University of Hawaiʻi) on an island. Occupying the small city of Orono, population ~9,500, the  campus has an enrollment (2012–2013) of 10,901 students. The campus has thirty-seven academic buildings, thirty administrative buildings, eighteen residence halls, eighteen specific laboratory facilities, fourteen Greek life houses, ten sports facilities, five museums, three dining facilities, two convenience stores, a student union, a cafe, a pub, an  state of the art recreation and fitness center, and a 200'x200' air supported athletic/recreational dome.

In 1867, the university rejected a campus plan by landscape architect Frederick Law Olmsted, who designed Central Park in New York City and the White House grounds in Washington, D.C. The plan's broad concepts, including the Front Lawn, were nevertheless adopted during the school's first fifty years, and were oriented toward the Stillwater River. A second master plan was produced in 1932 by Carl Rust Parker of the Olmsted Brothers firm, which reoriented the campus center to the Mall, an open grassy area between the Raymond H. Fogler Library and the Memorial Gym. The Mall is further bordered by one residence and five academic halls.

The campus is essentially divided into three sections (northern, southern, and hilltop), all of which are near or border the Mall. The northern section includes many of the athletic facilities, including the Alfond Arena (basketball, hockey), Morse Field at the Alfond Sports Stadium (football, track and field), Larry Mahaney Diamond (baseball), Kessock Field (softball), the Field Hockey Complex (field hockey), and the Mahaney athletic/recreational dome. Other buildings on the northern section include the Cutler Health Center, two administrative halls, three residence halls, and multiple academic halls.

The southern section of campus includes the Memorial Student Union, the Maynard F. Jordan Observatory, Lengyel Gymnasium and Athletic Field, the Buchanan Alumni House, as well as multiple administrative, residence, and academic halls. The recently renovated Collins Center for the Arts is also on the southern part of campus, and not only provides the Hutchins Concert Hall, a 1,435-seat venue for performing artists from around the world, but also houses the Hudson Museum, known for its contemporary Native American art, as well as displays that are culturally specific to the indigenous people of Maine. The Hilltop section of campus is populated largely with residence halls but also includes the  Lyle E. Littlefield Ornamental Gardens, as well as academic and recreational facilities. The campus is also designated as an arboretum.

The pre-1915 core of the campus, covering its earliest period of development, was listed as a historic district on the National Register of Historic Places in 1978; this was expanded to include the second major phase of development (through the end of World War II) in 2010.

Ambulance Service

The University of Maine operates the "University Volunteer Ambulance Corps," an Ambulance service fully licensed by the State of Maine. The service is operated by students and staff of the university. UVAC's ambulances are available to respond to emergencies on campus and can also provide mutual aid to many surrounding towns and agencies. The service ensures a licensed Emergency Medical Technician is sent on every call. The service has two ambulances both equipped to provide Paramedic Level care. UVAC responds to approximately 500 calls per school year.

Greek life
Greek life has existed at the University of Maine since 1874. Approximately 14% of University of Maine undergraduates are members of Greek letter organizations.

Fraternities

Alpha Delta 
Alpha Gamma Rho 
Alpha Sigma Phi
Alpha Tau Omega 
Beta Theta Pi 
Delta Tau Delta 
Iota Nu Kappa
Kappa Kappa Psi
Kappa Sigma
Lambda Chi Alpha
Phi Gamma Delta 
Phi Kappa Sigma 
Pi Kappa Phi
Sigma Chi 
Sigma Pi
Sigma Phi Epsilon 
Tau Kappa Epsilon 
Theta Chi

Sororities

Alpha Omicron Pi 
Alpha Phi 
Chi Omega 
Delta Delta Delta
Delta Phi Epsilon 
Delta Zeta
Phi Mu 
Pi Beta Phi

Sustainability
The University of Maine is one of 16 colleges and universities listed in Princeton Review's "Green Honor Roll" (2011). Several of the nation's leading research universities, including Virginia Tech, Georgia Tech, Oregon State, Arizona State and the University of Washington are also on that prestigious list, as are Harvard and Northeastern. Recognizing schools for their commitment to sustainability, the Green Honor Roll lists only those 16 institutions that received the highest possible score on The Princeton Review green rating. The guide lauds UMaine for its recycling programs, green-certified buildings and free shuttle bus service. It also notes the fact UMaine has a sustainability coordinator, a sustainability council, and "Eco Reps" in its residence halls.

University of Maine has a sustainability council made up of students, faculty, administrators, staff and a full-time sustainability coordinator. A green loan fund provides capital for energy efficiency and renewable energy investments. The university has committed to achieving carbon neutrality by 2040, and two residential-scale solar thermal systems are in place on Nutting Hall and Sebec House. The University of Maine composts food scraps from dining facilities, and York Dining Hall has gone trayless to reduce waste. For all new campus construction, LEED Silver standards are required. The Blue Bike program refurbishes abandoned bikes and rents them to students free of charge, providing a means of alternative transportation on and around-campus.

Dining services
In 2022, the university signed a contract to outsource campus dining services to Sodexo beginning on July 1, 2023.  Sodexo provides food service at Maine's six other public universities. The deal requires Sodexo to pay the university a $3 million signing bonus and invest $7 million in dining hall improvements.

Academics

The University of Maine offers more than 90 undergraduate major programs organized in five colleges: the College of Education and Human Development; the College of Engineering; the Honors College; the College of Liberal Arts and Sciences; and the College of Natural Sciences, Forestry and Agriculture. UMaine also is home to one of the nation's oldest honors programs, now called the Honors College. The Honors College offers academically qualified students an opportunity for intensive, interdisciplinary study. Students are invited to become part of the Honors College during the admissions review process. UMaine also offers a wide array of graduate programs, including more than seventy master's degree programs and thirty doctorate programs.

The University of Maine is one of only a handful of institutions to offer a combined developmental/clinical PhD to students accepted into their clinical psychology PhD program, as well as advanced degrees with distinct concentrations in developmental psychology, social psychology, cognitive psychology, and behavioral neuroscience. The University of Maine has a strong commitment to developing the next generation of neuroscience researchers and educators, thus along with offering a PhD in psychological science with a concentration in behavioral neuroscience, they also offer a neuroscience concentration for PhD students studying biomedical science.

It is the only institution in Maine ranked as a national university in the U.S. News & World Report annual rankings. U.S. News categorizes UMaine as an institution that offers "a full range of undergraduate majors, master's, and doctoral degrees."

UMaine is one of only four institutions in Maine (along with Bowdoin, Bates, and Colby) accredited to award membership into the Phi Beta Kappa honor society.

The university is also the birthplace of the Phi Kappa Phi honor society, recognizing high academic achievement across all disciplines.

The Raymond H. Fogler Library is the largest in Maine and serves as one of its intellectual hubs, attracting scholars, professors, and researchers from around the state. A collection of rare and ancient manuscripts, as well as about two million government publications, augment the university's collection. The Special Collections Unit includes the Stephen King (author and UMaine alumnus) papers, which attract researchers from across the globe.

UMaine hosts the Intensive English Institute, an English as a second language program designed to help students develop their English language skills for success in school, business, and social communication. Due to budget cuts during the COVID-19 pandemic, the IEI was discontinued as of May 31, 2020.

The University of Maine is also home to the Maine Business School, the largest business school in the state. Paris-based international educational consulting organization Eduniversal has included the Maine Business School at the University of Maine among its selection of 1,000 of the world's best business schools, ranking it as an "excellent business school-nationally strong and/or with continental links." In 2011, U.S. News & World Report ranked the Maine Business School among the nation's best business colleges

The Canadian-American Center, an institution that focuses on Canadian-American studies is based at the University of Maine.

Accreditation
The University of Maine is accredited by the New England Commission of Higher Education, and programmatically accredited by other accreditors including the Association to Advance Collegiate Schools of Business, the Accreditation Board for Engineering and Technology, the American Chemical Society, the American Dietetic Association, the American Psychological Association, the American Speech-Language-Hearing Association, the Commission on Collegiate Nursing Education, the Computing Sciences Accreditation Board, the Council on Social Work Education, the National Association of Schools of Music, the National Association of Schools of Public Affairs and Administration, the Council for the advancement of Educator Preparation, the Society of American Foresters, and the Society of Wood Science and Technology.

Admissions
The fall 2018 admissions data are as follows:

Enrollment
In the fall of 2020, the university's enrollment consisted of:

8,870 undergraduate degree-seeking students
595 undergraduate non-degree students
2,121 graduate degree-seeking students
155 graduate non-degree students
9,110 full-time students
2,631 part-time students

Research
The University of Maine is one of the National Science Foundation's top 100 public universities for research. In FY10, UMaine exceeded $100 million in external expenditures for research, 86% of which was federal funding. Leading sectors of the university in generating external support are advanced materials, marine sciences, climate change, environmental studies, forestry, precision manufacturing, and aquaculture. Undergraduate research is a priority at UMaine, and in 2008, the Center for Undergraduate Research was established to connect students with faculty projects that suit their interests.

The University of Maine has several research areas that operate as independent units under the umbrella of the University of Maine. While these units house and fund faculty, staff, and students from a variety of academic backgrounds and colleges, the research units are independent of the traditional departmental and college structure.

Independent research units at the University of Maine include:

UMaine Advanced Structures and Composites Center
The UMaine Advanced Structures and Composites Center, founded in 1996 with support from the National Science Foundation, provides research, education, and economic development encompassing material sciences, manufacturing and engineering of composites and structures. The center's research and development projects have included the VolturnUS 1:8, composite arch bridge system, and the Modular Ballistic Protection System (MBPS).

The center is the leading member of the DeepCwind Consortium, whose mission is to establish the State of Maine as a national leader in deepwater offshore wind technology.

Multisensory Interactive Media Lab
Founded in 2018, the Multisensory Interactive Media Lab (MIM Lab) is moving into an era of ‘Internet of Everything,’ in which everything and everyone will be digitally embedded and connected. In the MIM Lab of the University of Maine, academic researchers develop novel enabling technologies to explore the immense potential for the communication of our experiences – shifting focus from the current age of information towards a new age of experience. Many of their research works try to answer a fundamental question “How can we move beyond traditional visual- and auditory-based digital interfaces to form immersive sensory rich interactions in the context of real-world, augmented or virtual experiences?”.

UMaine Deepwater Offshore Wind Test Site at Monhegan Island 
The University of Maine was granted an ocean energy demonstration site through state legislation in 2009. The site, known as the UMaine Deepwater Offshore Wind Test Site, is available for use by commercial and non-commercial entities in partnership with the university to research and develop ocean energy devices, such as floating wind turbines or wave energy converters.

Forest Land Resources
Among the most prominent are: Aroostook Farm, (Presque Isle, Maine); Bear Brook Watershed, (Hancock County, Maine); Dwight B. Demeritt Forest, (Orono, Maine / Old Town, Maine); Fay Hyland Bog, (Orono / Veazie, Maine); and Hirundo Wildlife Refuge, (Old Town, Maine).

Bureau of Labor Education
The Bureau of Labor Education at the University of Maine in August 1966 with funds appropriated by the Maine Legislature. Its mission is to ensure that “appropriate and specialized educational programs (be made) available to members of the Maine labor force, both organized and unorganized.” Historian Charles Scontras has been affiliated with the BLE since its founding with his first book being published also in 1966.

The Largest 3D Printer in the World
The University of Maine built the world's largest 3D printer, which resulted in two more broken records for the largest 3D printed vessel and the largest 3D printed house.

Athletics

The University of Maine participates in the NCAA's Division I level, and is a member of the Colonial Athletic Association for football, Hockey East for ice hockey, and the America East Conference for all other sports. The school has won two national championships, both in men's ice hockey. In 1993, they defeated Lake Superior State University 5–4 behind a third period hat trick by Jim Montgomery. In 1999, they defeated rival University of New Hampshire 3–2 in overtime on a goal by Marcus Gustafsson.

In 1965, the football team competed in the Tangerine Bowl in Orlando, Florida against East Carolina. They were beaten in the game 31–0, but remain the only team from Maine to compete in a bowl contest. In the 2018 season they went to the FCS Semifinal, eventually losing to Eastern Washington.

The baseball team has participated in seven College World Series, six of them under coach John Winkin between 1976 and 1986, and one under Jack Butterfield in 1964. The Black Bears achieved two third-place finishes in 1964 and 1982.

Although the official fight song of UMaine is "For Maine", the school's main spirit song is the better-known "Maine Stein Song". Written by Lincoln Colcord (words) and E. A. Fenstad (music), the tune rose to fame when singer Rudy Vallée arranged the current version. Vallee attended Maine from 1921 to 1922 before transferring to Yale, and his popularity helped make the song a national favorite. To this day, the "Stein Song" remains the only college fight song to ever reach number one on the pop charts, achieving this distinction in 1930. According to College Fight Songs: An Annotated Anthology, by Studwell and Schueneman, the "Stein Song" is one of the very best fight songs of all time.

In addition to varsity athletics, the university offers many club sports through its Campus Recreation department. Sport clubs represent UMaine by competing against teams and clubs from other universities and colleges. National governing bodies for each club provide competition guidelines and league structure.

Sport clubs are student-led and student-administered. Each has a budget that is run through Campus Recreation, which in part funds nearly all clubs. Clubs are eligible for funding through Campus Recreation after they have been active for at least one year and have a membership minimum of ten members. Current club sports include alpine skiing, baseball, crew, cricket, cycling, fastpitch softball, field hockey, golf, ice hockey, lacrosse, Nordic skiing, roller hockey, rugby, shotokan karate, soccer, tennis, table tennis, tackle football, ultimate, and volleyball.

Notable alumni

See also
University of Maine School of Law

References

External links

1865 establishments in Maine
University of Maine
Educational institutions established in 1865
Land-grant universities and colleges
Botanical gardens in Maine
Forestry education
Historic districts on the National Register of Historic Places in Maine
Universities and colleges in Penobscot County, Maine
Flagship universities in the United States
National Register of Historic Places in Penobscot County, Maine
University of Maine